The Grand Prix de Saint-Raphaël was a single-day road cycling race held in the department of Var, France between 1953 and 1984.

Winners

References

Cycle races in France
1953 establishments in France
Recurring sporting events established in 1953
1984 disestablishments in France
Recurring sporting events disestablished in 1984
Defunct cycling races in France